Clater is a surname. Notable people with the surname include:

Francis Clater  (1756–1823), British farrier and writer
, MP
Thomas Clater (1789–1867), English painter

See also
Slater (surname)